Deyen Mitchell "Digger" Lawson (born 4 January 1991) is an Australian professional golfer playing on the European Tour and PGA Tour of Australasia.

Early golf career
Lawson started playing golf at the age of 10. In 2017, he completed a golf professional trainee-ship at Curlewis Golf Club in Geelong, Australia.

Professional career
Lawson earned a place on the PGA Tour of Australasia in 2016. In 2017 he was runner-up in the Northern Territory PGA Championship, and in early 2018 he was a runner-up in the NZ PGA Championship. In late 2018, he attended the European Tour Qualifying Tour school for the second time. He finished tied for 13th at the final stage, gaining a full time playing card for 2019 season.

In the first half of his debut season on the European Tour, Lawson had the unusual achievement of two holes-in-one. The first happened at Alfred Dunhill Championship in December 2018. For his effort, Lawson won a BMW 8 Series worth around A$250,000. He scored his second ace at the Commercial Bank Qatar Masters in March 2019. Both aces Lawson used an eight iron.

Lawson finished 187th on the European Tour Race to Dubai rankings for 2019. He returned to European Tour Q school and gained limited playing membership rights (exemption category 22) for the 2020 season by making the cut at the final stage.

Lawson finished 17th on the PGA Tour of Australasia 2019 Order of Merit from just six starts. This included two top-10 finishes; tied runner-up at the Queensland PGA Championship and tied for 10th place at the Australian Open.

Professional wins (1)

PGA Tour of Australasia wins (1)

Results in major championships

CUT = missed the half-way cut

References

External links

Australian male golfers
PGA Tour of Australasia golfers
Sportspeople from Geelong
Sportspeople from the Gold Coast, Queensland
European Tour golfers
1991 births
Living people